The Government College of Engineering (GCE) in Dharmapuri is an engineering college in the Dharmapuri district of Tamil Nadu, India. Government College of Engineering, Dharmapuri was  affiliated with Anna University.

References

External links

Engineering colleges in Tamil Nadu
Educational institutions established in 2013
2013 establishments in Tamil Nadu
Colleges affiliated to Anna University
Education in Dharmapuri district